The Western Electric rules are decision rules in statistical process control for detecting out-of-control or non-random conditions on control charts.  Locations of the observations relative to the control chart control limits (typically at ±3 standard deviations) and centerline indicate whether the process in question should be investigated for assignable causes.  The Western Electric rules were codified by a specially-appointed committee of the manufacturing division of the Western Electric Company and appeared in the first edition of a 1956 handbook, that became a standard text of the field.  Their purpose was to ensure that line workers and engineers interpret control charts in a uniform way.

Motivation
The rules attempt to distinguish unnatural patterns from natural patterns based on several criteria:
The absence of points near the centerline is identified as a mixture pattern.

The absence of points near the control limits is identified as a stratification pattern.

The presence of points outside the control limits is identified as an instability pattern.

Other unnatural patterns are categorized as systematic (autocorrelative), repetition, or trend patterns.

This classification divides the chart of observations into zones, measured in units of standard deviation (σ) between the centerline and control limits, as follows:

Zones A, B, and C are sometimes called the three sigma zone, two sigma zone, and one sigma zone, respectively.

Zone rules
An important aspect of the Western Electric rules are the zone rules, designed to detect process instability, and the presence of assignable causes.
Data sets of observations are appraised by four basic rules, that categorize the occurrence of data samples in a set of zones defined by multiples of the standard deviation.

These rules are evaluated for one side of the center line (one half of the control band) at a time (e.g., first the centerline to the upper control limit, then the centerline to the lower control limit).

Data satisfying any of these conditions as indicated by the control chart provide the justification for investigating the process to discover whether assignable causes are present and can be removed.  Note that there is always a possibility of false positives:  Assuming observations are normally distributed, one expects Rule 1 to be triggered by chance one out of every 370 observations on average.  The false alarm rate rises to one out of every 91.75 observations when evaluating all four rules.

Asymmetric control limits
The zone rules presented above apply to control charts with symmetric control limits. The handbook provides additional guidelines for control charts where the control limits are not symmetrical, as for R charts and p-charts.

For  and R charts (which plot the behavior of the subgroup range), the Handbook recommends using the zone rules above for subgroups of sufficient size (five or more).  For small sample subgroups, the Handbook recommends:

For other control charts based on skewed distributions, the Handbook recommends:
Finding the probabilities associated with each zone
Devising tests that should result in the desired sensitivity to the presence of assignable causes

Other unnatural patterns
The handbook also identifies patterns that require consideration of both the upper and lower halves of the control chart together for identification:

See also
Nelson rules
Westgard rules

References

Quality control tools
Technical communication
Statistical charts and diagrams